The Long-Term Stock Exchange (LTSE) is an SEC-registered national securities exchange built to serve companies and investors who share a long-term vision.

History

Founding
Eric Ries proposed a Long-Term Stock Exchange, among other ideas, in his 2011 book The Lean Startup. The idea was to create a new kind of stock exchange, designed to trade in the stock of companies that are organized to sustain long-term thinking. In 2015, he began to set it up himself. Since inception, the LTSE has focused on support for companies that prioritize long-term success and a stakeholder approach.

SEC approval
LTSE filed an application to the Securities and Exchange Commission for registration as a national securities exchange on November 30, 2018; it was approved on May 10, 2019.

In its ruling to approve the application, the SEC noted that it had received one comment objecting to LTSE's registration because of its proposed rule concerning corporate governance of listing companies that does not require "one share, one vote".

In reply, the Commission noted that the proposed rules were substantially similar to those at other national exchanges, such as requiring the independence of most directors, committees for audit and executive compensation, and codes of conduct. But the Commission stated that there is no requirement for "one share, one vote", as long as no existing shareholders are disenfranchised.  The Commission also noted that the application did not include any provisions for "time phased voting rights", which would have to be approved separately as a proposed rule change in the future.

The exchange launched in September 2020.

Exchange features

Operating principles
Companies that list their shares for sale on the Long-Term Stock Exchange will be required to publish a series of policies that focus on long-term value creation and are designed to provide shareholders and other stakeholders with insight into the way that companies operate and build their businesses for the long term. The principles hold that: (1) Long-term focused companies should consider a broader group of stakeholders and the critical role they play in one another's success; (2) Long-term focused companies should measure success in years and decades, and prioritize long-term decision-making; (3) Long-term focused companies should align executive compensation and board compensation with long-term performance; (4) Boards of directors of long-term focused companies should be engaged in, and have explicit oversight of, long-term strategy; and (5) Long-term focused companies should engage with their long-term shareholders.

See also
 List of stock exchanges in the Americas
 List of American Exchanges
 List of stock exchange opening times

References

External links
  
 

American companies established in 2018
Stock exchanges in the United States
Companies based in San Francisco
Financial services companies established in 2018
San Francisco